The arrondissement of Cambrai is an arrondissement of France in the Nord department in the Hauts-de-France region. It has 116 communes.

Composition

The communes of the arrondissement of Cambrai, and their INSEE codes, are:

 Abancourt (59001)
 Anneux (59010)
 Aubencheul-au-Bac (59023)
 Avesnes-les-Aubert (59037)
 Awoingt (59039)
 Banteux (59047)
 Bantigny (59048)
 Bantouzelle (59049)
 Bazuel (59055)
 Beaumont-en-Cambrésis (59059)
 Beaurain (59060)
 Beauvois-en-Cambrésis (59063)
 Bermerain (59069)
 Bertry (59074)
 Béthencourt (59075)
 Bévillers (59081)
 Blécourt (59085)
 Boursies (59097)
 Boussières-en-Cambrésis (59102)
 Briastre (59108)
 Busigny (59118)
 Cagnoncles (59121)
 Cambrai (59122)
 Cantaing-sur-Escaut (59125)
 Capelle (59127)
 Carnières (59132)
 Le Cateau-Cambrésis (59136)
 Catillon-sur-Sambre (59137)
 Cattenières (59138)
 Caudry (59139)
 Caullery (59140)
 Cauroir (59141)
 Clary (59149)
 Crèvecœur-sur-l'Escaut (59161)
 Cuvillers (59167)
 Dehéries (59171)
 Doignies (59176)
 Élincourt (59191)
 Escarmain (59204)
 Escaudœuvres (59206)
 Esnes (59209)
 Estourmel (59213)
 Estrun (59219)
 Eswars (59216)
 Flesquières (59236)
 Fontaine-au-Pire (59243)
 Fontaine-Notre-Dame (59244)
 Fressies (59255)
 Gonnelieu (59267)
 Gouzeaucourt (59269)
 La Groise (59274)
 Haucourt-en-Cambrésis (59287)
 Haussy (59289)
 Haynecourt (59294)
 Hem-Lenglet (59300)
 Honnechy (59311)
 Honnecourt-sur-Escaut (59312)
 Inchy (59321)
 Iwuy (59322)
 Lesdain (59341)
 Ligny-en-Cambrésis (59349)
 Malincourt (59372)
 Marcoing (59377)
 Maretz (59382)
 Masnières (59389)
 Maurois (59394)
 Mazinghien (59395)
 Mœuvres (59405)
 Montay (59412)
 Montigny-en-Cambrésis (59413)
 Montrécourt (59415)
 Naves (59422)
 Neuville-Saint-Rémy (59428)
 Neuvilly (59430)
 Niergnies (59432)
 Noyelles-sur-Escaut (59438)
 Ors (59450)
 Paillencourt (59455)
 Pommereuil (59465)
 Proville (59476)
 Quiévy (59485)
 Raillencourt-Sainte-Olle (59488)
 Ramillies (59492)
 Rejet-de-Beaulieu (59496)
 Reumont (59498)
 Ribécourt-la-Tour (59500)
 Rieux-en-Cambrésis (59502)
 Romeries (59506)
 Les Rues-des-Vignes (59517)
 Rumilly-en-Cambrésis (59520)
 Sailly-lez-Cambrai (59521)
 Saint-Aubert (59528)
 Saint-Benin (59531)
 Saint-Hilaire-lez-Cambrai (59533)
 Saint-Martin-sur-Écaillon (59537)
 Saint-Python (59541)
 Saint-Souplet (59545)
 Saint-Vaast-en-Cambrésis (59547)
 Sancourt (59552)
 Saulzoir (59558)
 Séranvillers-Forenville (59567)
 Solesmes (59571)
 Sommaing (59575)
 Thun-l'Évêque (59593)
 Thun-Saint-Martin (59595)
 Tilloy-lez-Cambrai (59597)
 Troisvilles (59604)
 Vendegies-sur-Écaillon (59608)
 Vertain (59612)
 Viesly (59614)
 Villers-en-Cauchies (59622)
 Villers-Guislain (59623)
 Villers-Outréaux (59624)
 Villers-Plouich (59625)
 Walincourt-Selvigny (59631)
 Wambaix (59635)

History

The arrondissement of Cambrai was created in 1800.

As a result of the reorganisation of the cantons of France which came into effect in 2015, the borders of the cantons are no longer related to the borders of the arrondissements. The cantons of the arrondissement of Cambrai were, as of January 2015:

 Cambrai-Est
 Cambrai-Ouest
 Carnières
 Le Cateau-Cambrésis
 Clary
 Marcoing
 Solesmes

References

Cambrai
French Hainaut